Elections to Glasgow City Council were held on 1 May 2003, the same day as the other Scottish local government elections and the Scottish Parliament general election.

Election results

Ward results

By-elections since 3 May 2007

2006 by-election

Milton ward: SNP gain from Labour (councillor William McAllister elected).

References

2003
2003 Scottish local elections
2000s in Glasgow